Etiella is a genus of snout moths. It was described by Philipp Christoph Zeller in 1839.

Species
 Etiella behrii (Zeller, 1848)
 Etiella chrysoporella Meyrick, 1879
 Etiella grisea Hampson, 1903
 Etiella hobsoni (Butler, 1880)
 Etiella scitivittalis (Walker, 1863)
 Etiella walsinghamella Ragonot, 1888
 Etiella zinckenella (Treitschke, 1832)

References

Phycitini
Pyralidae genera
Taxa named by Philipp Christoph Zeller